Gumshoe is a light gun shooter video game developed and published by Nintendo for the Nintendo Entertainment System. It was released in 1986 in North America and in 1988 in Europe. Unusual for a Nintendo game, it was not released in Japan. It was designed by Yoshio Sakamoto.

Plot 
Mr. Stevenson is an ex-FBI agent turned detective. He receives a ransom note from a mafia boss, King Dom, who has kidnapped Stevenson's daughter, Jennifer. Stevenson must collect five "Black Panther Diamonds" within 24 hours in order to see his daughter again.

Gameplay
Mr. Stevenson walks continuously to the right and will jump if shot with the NES Zapper. The player must also shoot enemies as they appear on screen. Shooting Mr. Stevenson to make him jump will not subtract from the player's ammunition. Shooting obstacles, or an empty area, however, will subtract one bullet from the total. Grabbing red balloons will add bullets to Mr. Stevenson's arsenal.

Release 
The release date changed several times. It was first scheduled for June of 1987, was later changed to August of 1986, but actually released in September.

References

External links 
Gumshoe at NinDB

1986 video games
Detective video games
Light gun games
Nintendo arcade games
Nintendo Entertainment System games
Nintendo games
Nintendo Research & Development 1 games
Nintendo Vs. Series games
Organized crime video games
Platform games
Video games scored by Hirokazu Tanaka
Video games designed by Yoshio Sakamoto
Video games developed in Japan